Demoz is a demo album by US singer-songwriter Marcella Detroit, released in 1999 through her website. All songs were written and produced by Detroit herself.

Track listing

References 

1999 albums